Ernest Vandeweghe is the name of:

 Ernie Vandeweghe (1928–2014), former basketball player for the New York Knicks
 Kiki Vandeweghe (born 1958), his son, former basketball player for the Denver Nuggets, Portland Trail Blazers, New York Knicks and Los Angeles Clippers